Namutoni Airport  is an airport serving Namutoni and the Etosha National Park in Namibia. Namutoni is an entrance gate to the park.

See also

List of airports in Namibia
Transport in Namibia

References

External links
 OurAirports - Namutoni
 OpenStreetMap - Namutoni
 Google Earth

Airports in Namibia